Queen Elizabeth-class may refer to:

 , of the early 20th century
 Queen Elizabeth-class aircraft carrier (1960s), planned design of the 1960s
 , a class of two 65,000-tonne aircraft carriers commissioned in 2017 and 2019 respectively

See also